Scaeosopha incantata is a species of moth of the family Cosmopterigidae. It is found in Brunei, India (the Andamans), Indonesia (Sumatra) and Malaysia.

The wingspan is 20–21 mm. The ground colour of the forewings is yellow.

References

Moths described in 1928
Scaeosophinae